Swanson v. Citibank N.A. 614 F 3d 400 (2010) is a discrimination law and US civil procedure case, concerning the scope of federal preemption against state law for labor rights.

Facts
Ms Gloria Swanson claimed Citibank had committed race discrimination in her application for a home equity loan, because their home value appraiser unjustifiably devalued her property as she was African-American under the Fair Housing Act, 42 USC §3605, and the Equal Credit Opportunity Act, 15 USC §1691(a)(1). Citibank had received money from the Troubled Asset Relief Program to put money into home equity, in order to prop up the housing market after the sub-prime mortgage crisis. Swanson had visited the bank, and was told she should apply along with her husband. She had refused to answer a question about race, but the bank employee pointed to a photo of his family who were part African-American also. Swanson disclosed that Washington Mutual Bank previously had denied her a home-equity loan. After Swanson applied to the bank, a preliminary home valuation was $240,000. Then an appraiser, Andre Lanier who worked for PCI Appraisal Services, visited the home and valued it at $170,000. After Swanson claimed, Citibank brought a motion to dismiss the claim under the Federal Rules of Civil Procedure Rule 12(b)(6), that the grounds were too indefinite and unreasonable.

Judgment
Wood J, joined by Easterbook J, allowed the claim to proceed.

Posner J dissented.

See also
Ashcroft v. Iqbal, 556 US 662 (2009)
United States labor law

United States racial desegregation case law
United States banking case law
United States civil procedure case law